Oncidium klotzschianum is a species of orchid occurring from Costa Rica to Peru and Venezuela.

klotzschianum
Orchids of Central America
Orchids of South America